SAS Somerset was a Bar-class boom defence vessel of the South African Navy, now preserved as a museum ship in Cape Town. Formerly HMS Barcross, it operated in Saldanha Bay, transferred to South Africa Naval Forces during World War II and was purchased by South Africa in 1947.

History 
Somerset was originally built in Blyth, Northumberland, United Kingdom, by Blyth Shipbuilding Company and commissioned as HMS Barcross in 1941. HMS Barcross and her sister ship HMS Barbrake arrived at the Cape Station at Simon's Town, South Africa, in 1942 and was transferred to Saldanha Bay for boom defence operations directly thereafter. In 1943 she was re-designated as HMSAS Barcross when she was transferred to the South African Naval Forces for the remainder of World War II.

In 1946, the Government of South Africa purchased Barcross and used for the dumping of ammunition off Cape Town and Port Elizabeth. On completion of these services, she was transferred to Salisbury Island in Durban and subsequently was laid up at Salisbury Island. In 1951 her name was changed to Somerset. In 1953 while still decommissioned Somerset was used in the raising of the sunken minelayer Skilpad (ex-Spindrift) at Salisbury Island.

During 1955 Somerset was recommissioned, and during this period she was tasked in salvaging the remains of two Harvard trainer aircraft following a midair collision over Table Bay. Six weeks later she recovered a third Harvard which had crashed into the sea off Bok Point. During a refit in 1959, Somerset had her coal-fired boilers converted to firing by furnace oil. She was responsible for the laying of an oil pipeline at the port of Mossel Bay to serve the oil terminal there.

In 1961 Somerset salvaged the South African Railways tug Schermbrucker, which had sunk in the harbour at East London. In 1967 she was fitted with new boilers and a reconditioned main engine. In 1968 her services were called on again to assist the cable ship John W. Mackay in raising and repairing the newly inaugurated overseas telephone cable in the shallow waters off Melkbosstrand. During 1969 Somerset raised the old whale catcher Wagter 11 in Saldanha Bay and subsequently towed her back to Simon's Town. During the same year, she salvaged a floating crane which had capsized and sunk at Port Elizabeth. In the early hours of 24 July 1974 Somerset was dispatched to Cape Agulhas to assist with the salvage of the Oriental Pioneer, but poor weather conditions and bad luck rendered this effort unsuccessful. In 1981, Somerset raised the fishing trawler Aldebaran, which had lain on the harbour bottom at Port Elizabeth for over two-and-a-half years. Somerset also acted as a standby vessel during submarine shallow-water diving operations. In 1983 she assisted in the salvaging of a barge and two whale catchers at Saldanha Bay.

In March 1986, Somerset was finally paid off. In 1988 the old boom defence vessel was donated for use as a museum ship, moored at the waterfront at Cape Town. Her original Royal Navy badge can be seen displayed on the side of the Selborne drydock.

Now used as a museum ship, Somerset has been moored on the Victoria & Alfred Waterfront in Cape Town since 2 September 1988, and is the only boom defence vessel remaining in the world, as well as the only remaining ship that served in the South African Naval Forces

Gallery

Notes

References 

Maritime history of South Africa
Boom defence vessels of the South African Navy
Boom defence vessels of the Royal Navy
Ships built on the River Blyth
1941 ships
Museum ships in South Africa
Ships and vessels on the National Archive of Historic Vessels